Revelation Records is an independent record label focusing originally and primarily on hardcore punk. The label is known for releases by bands such as Youth of Today, Warzone, Sick of It All, Quicksand, Side By Side, Chain of Strength, Shelter, Judge, No for an Answer, Gorilla Biscuits, and End of a Year.

Revelation, along with the bands it put out in the late 1980s, is usually credited with creating and cementing the "youth crew" sound as well as New York hardcore, which bridged the gap from the earlier bands of almost a decade before and helped carry the music through the early 1990s. Some of the label's best selling releases have been Gorilla Biscuits' Start Today, Inside Out's No Spiritual Surrender, and the In-Flight Program compilation.

History 
Formerly of New Haven, Connecticut, it is now based in Huntington Beach, California. It was founded in 1987 by owner Jordan Cooper, along with Ray Cappo of Youth of Today, with the sole intent of producing the Warzone Lower East Side Crew 7-inch. Within the year, they put out two more releases and a limited 4th pressing of Youth of Today's Can't Close My Eyes 7-inch, which had been originally released on Positive Force Records, just for the two of them to trade for vintage G.I.Joes and other action figures. In the first three years, the label put out 23 releases and pressed approximately 50,000 records, and it has continued to release an average of 7–8 albums a year.

Cappo left the business in 1988, to focus on his band Shelter. He also started his own label Equal Vision Records (which he later sold to Youth of Today roadie, former Revelation employee and friend, Steve Reddy), though his albums were still released by Revelation after that, and he also operated Supersoul Records.

The label put out several definitive hardcore and metalcore records in the late 1990s and early 2000s, with notable releases coming from Damnation A.D., Will Haven, Shai Hulud, Curl Up and Die, and Himsa. However, by the mid-2000s, Revelation Records had seemingly fallen by the wayside, with very few releases between 2004 and 2006. However, the label is returning to its former stature as a premier old-school hardcore label with strong releases from newer bands like Down to Nothing, Shook Ones, and Sinking Ships.

Discography 

REV 001 – Warzone – Lower East Side Crew 7-inch EP (1987)
REV 002 – New York City Hardcore:Together compilation 7-inch EP (1987)
REV 003 – Sick of It All – self-titled 7-inch EP (1987)
REV 004 – Gorilla Biscuits – self-titled 7-inch EP (1987)
REV 005 – Side by Side – You're Only Young Once... 7-inch (1988)
REV 006 – No For An Answer – You Laugh 7-inch EP (1988)
REV 007 – New York City Hardcore: The Way It Is compilation CD (1988)
reissued in 1992.
REV 008 – Youth of Today – Break Down the Walls LP (1988)
REV 009 – Bold – Speak Out LP (1988)
REV 010 – Chain of Strength – The One Thing That Still Holds True LP (1995)
REV 011 – Bold – Looking Back LP (1989)
REV 012 – Gorilla Biscuits – Start Today LP (1989)
REV 013 – Slipknot – self-titled 7-inch EP (1989)
REV 014 – Judge – New York Crew 7-inch(1989)
REV 015 – Judge – Bringin' It Down 12-inch(1989)
REV 016 – Shelter – Perfection of Desire 12-inch (1990)
REV 017 – Youth of Today – self-titled 7-inch (1990)
REV 018 – Quicksand – self-titled 7-inch EP (1990)
REV 019 – Inside Out – No Spiritual Surrender 7-inch EP (1990)
REV 020 – Judge – The Storm 7-inch EP (1990)
REV 021 – Supertouch – The Earth Is Flat 12-inch (1990)
REV 022 – Burn – self-titled 7-inch (1990)
REV 023 – Ray & Porcell – self-titled 7-inch (1991)
REV 024 – Into Another – self-titled 12-inch (1991)
REV 025 – Farside – Rochambeau 12-inch (1992)
REV 027 – Iceburn – Hephaestus 12-inch (1993)
REV 028 – Underdog – Demos 12-inch (1993)
REV 029 – Statue – Filter the Infection 12-inch (1993)
REV 030 – Mike Judge & Old Smoke – Sights 12-inch (1993)
REV 031 – Youth of Today – Break Down the Walls LP/CD (1997)
REV 029 – Orange 9mm – self-titled 12-inch (1994)
REV 030 – Sense Field – Killed for Less 12-inch (1994)
REV 031 – Farside – Rigged 12-inch (1994)
REV 032 – Iceburn/Engine Kid – split 12-inch (1994)
REV 033 – Into Another – Ignaurus 12-inch (1994)
REV 034 – Iceburn – Poetry of Fire 12-inch (1994)
REV 035 – Sense Field – self-titled 12-inch (1994)
REV 036 – Engine Kid – Angel Wings 12-inch (1995)
REV 037 – Whirlpool – self-titled 12-inch (1995)
REV 038 – Shades Apart – Save It 12-inch (1995)
REV 039 – CIV – Set Your Goals 12-inch (1996)
REV 040 – CIV – Can't Wait One More Minute 7-inch (1995)
REV 041 – CIV – All Twisted 7-inch (1995)
REV 042 – Into Another – Poison Fingers 7-inch (1995)
REV 043 – Quicksand (American band) – Manic Compression 12-inch (1995)
REV 044 – State of the Nation self-titled 12-inch (1995)
REV 045 – Farside – self-titled 7-inch (1995)
REV 046 – Sense Field – Building 12-inch (1996)
REV 047 – Texas Is the Reason – self-titled 7-inch (1995)
REV 048 – Into Another – Seemless 12-inch (1996)
REV 049 – Iceburn Collective – Meditavolutions 12-inch (1996)
REV 050 – In-Flight Program compilation CD (1997)
REV 051 – Texas Is the Reason – Do You Know Who You Are? 12-inch (1997)
REV 052 – Whirlpool – Liquid Glass 12-inch (1997)
REV 053 – Good Riddance / Ignite – split 12-inch (1997)
REV 054 – Ignite – Past Our Means 12-inch (1997)
REV 055 – CIV – Social Climber 12-inch (1997)
REV 056 – Rage Against the Machine – People of the Sun (1997)
REV 057 – Shades Apart – Seeing Things (1997)
REV 058 – Kiss It Goodbye – She Loves Me, She Loves Me Not 12-inch (1997)
REV 059 – Youth of Today –  We're Not in This Alone (1997)
REV 060 – Better Than A Thousand – Just One 12-inch (1997)
REV 064 - Speak 714 - "Knee Deep in Guilt" (1998)
REV 067 – In My Eyes – The Difference Between (1998)
REV 068 – Elliott – U.S. Songs (1998)
REV 070 - Morning Again - As Tradition Dies Slowly (1998)
REV 072 - Nerve Agents - "S/T" (1999)
REV 073 - Speak 714 - "The Scum Also Rises" (1999)
REV 074 - Where Fear and Weapons Meet - "S/T" 7-inch (1999)
REV 080 – In My Eyes – Nothing to Hide (1999)
REV 081 – Kiss it Goodbye – Choke EP 7-inch/CD (1999)
REV 082 – By a Thread – The Last of the Daydreams (1999)
REV 083 – Garrison – The Bend Before the Break (1999)
REV 084 – Himsa – S/T 7-inch (1999)
REV 085 – Fastbreak – Whenever You're Ready
REV 087 – Himsa – Ground Breaking Ceremony CD (November 2, 1999)
REV 093 – Garrison – A Mile in Cold Water
REV 097 – The Movielife – This Time Next Year CD (2000)
REV 099 – Gameface – Always On
REV 100 – Revelation 100: 15 Year Retrospective of Rare Recordings compilation CD
REV 101 – Right Brigade – Right Brigade
REV 103 – Garrison – Be a Criminal
REV 105 – Thirty-two Frames – Thirty-two Frames CD (2002)
REV 110 – Revelation Records 2004 Collection compilation CD (2004)
REV 112 – Since By Man – We Sing the Body Electric CD/LP (2003)
REV 115 – Shai Hulud – That Within Blood Ill-Tempered (2003)
Reached position #39 on the Billboard Independent Album chart.
REV 118 – Garrison – The Silhouette EP CD(2003)
REV 119 – Christiansen – Stylish Nihilists (2003)
REV 120 – On The Might Of Princes – Sirens (2003)
REV 121 – Call Me Lightning – The Trouble We're In (2005)
REV 122 – Judge – What It Meant – The Complete Discography 2×LP/CD (2005)
REV 123 – Sincebyman – A Love Hate Relationship EP/CD (2004)
REV 124 – Pitch Black – This Is the Modern Sound CD (2005)
REV 125 – The Plot to Blow Up the Eiffel Tower – Love in the Fascist Brothel CD (2005)
REV 126 – Curl Up and Die – The One Above All, The End of All That Is CD (2005)
REV 127 – Temper Temper – Temper Temper LP/CD (2005)
REV 128 – Shai Hulud – A Comprehensive Retrospective or: How We Learned to Stop Worrying and Release Bad and Useless Recordings compilation CD (2005)
REV 129 – Bold – The Search : 1985–1989 CD/LP/2×LP (2005)
REV 130 – Generations: A Hardcore Compilation compilation CD
REV 131 – Elliott – Photorecording CD/DVD (2005)
REV 132 – Since By Man – Pictures from the Hotel Apocalypse LP/CD (2005)
REV 133 – Twilight Transmission – The Dance of Destruction
REV 134 – Shook Ones – Slaughter of the Insole
REV 135 – Gracer – Voices Travel
REV 136 – Sinking Ships – Disconnecting
REV 137 – Shai Hulud – A Profound Hatred of Man
REV 138 – Shai Hulud – Hearts Once Nourished with Hope and Compassion
REV 139 – End of a Year – Sincerely
REV 140 – Down to Nothing – Higher Learning
REV 141 – Down to Nothing – The Most
REV 142 – Shook Ones – Facetious Folly Feat
REV 143 – Sinking Ships – Ten
REV 144 – Capital – Homefront
REV 145 – Living Hell – The Lost and the Damned
REV 146 – Down to Nothing – Unbreakable
REV 147 – Mouthpiece – Can't Kill What's Inside: The Complete Discography LP/CD (2009)
REV 148 – By a Thread – self-titled LP/CD (2011)
REV 149 – The Rival Mob – Mob Justice LP (2013)
REV 150 – Various – PastPresent: Breaking Out the Classics compilation LP (2010)
REV 151 – Texas Is The Reason – Do You Know Who You Are?: The Complete Collection (2013)
REV 152 – Down To Nothing – Greetings from Richmond, Virginia 7-inch EP (2013)
REV 153 – Down To Nothing – Life On The James LP/CD (2013)
REV 154 – Title Fight – Spring Songs 7-inch (2013)
REV 155 – Soul Search – Nothing but a Nightmare 7-inch (2014)
REV 156 – Forced Order – Retribution 7-inch (2014)
REV 157 – Give – Sonic Bloom 12-inch EP (2015)
REV 158 – Violent Reaction – Marching On LP (2015)
REV 159 – Fell to Low – Low in the Dust LP (2015)
REV 160 – Beyond – Dew It! / Live Crucial Chaos WNYU LP (2015)
REV 161 – Forced Order – Vanished Crusade LP/CD (2015)
REV 162 – World Be Free – The Anti-Circle LP/CD(2016)
REV 163 – Warzone – Don't Forget the Struggle Don't Forget the Streets LP (2016)
REV 164 – Beyond – No Longer At Ease LP/CD/CS (2016)
REV 165 – Down To Nothing – Live! On the James LP (2017)
REV 166 – Jeff Caudill – Voice b/w Wishing Well 7-inch EP (2017)
REV 166 – Jeff Caudill – Voice b/w Wishing Well
REV 167 – Search – Between The Lines EP 7-inch (2017)
REV 168 – Fall Silent – Cart Return EP 7-inch (2017)
REV 169 – Primal Rite – Sensory Link to Pain EP 7-inch (2017)
REV 170 – Battery – For The Rejected by the Rejected compilation LP (2017)
REV 171 – Primal Rite – Dirge of Escapism LP/CD (2018)
REV 172 – Crippled Youth – Join the Fight 7-inch (2018)
REV 173 – Warzone – Open Your Eyes CD/LP/CS (2018)
REV 182-2 – Drain – "California Cursed" LP (2020)
REV 183-1 – Constant Elevation – "Freedom Beach" 7-inch (2020)
REV 184-1 – World Be Free – "One Time for Unity" 12-inch EP (2020)
REVTP 001 – Speedway – "When If Not Now?" Tape (2021)

External links 
 Official website
 The Revelation Records discography
 The pressing history of most Revelation releases
 Revelation online music distribution.
 An Interview with Jordan Cooper
 An Interview with Jordan Cooper on PMAKid.com

Record labels established in 1987
American independent record labels
Hardcore record labels
Punk record labels
Revelation Records